Vital Manuel N'Simba (born 8 July 1993) is a professional footballer who plays as a defender for  club Bordeaux. Born in Angola, he played one match for the DR Congo national team in 2016.

References

External links
 
 

1993 births
Living people
People from Luanda Province
Association football defenders
Democratic Republic of the Congo footballers
Angolan footballers
Angolan people of Democratic Republic of the Congo descent
Ligue 1 players
Ligue 2 players
Championnat National players
FC Girondins de Bordeaux players
En Avant Guingamp players
Luçon FC players
Football Bourg-en-Bresse Péronnas 01 players
Clermont Foot players
Democratic Republic of the Congo expatriate footballers
Democratic Republic of the Congo expatriate sportspeople in France
Expatriate footballers in France
Democratic Republic of the Congo international footballers